Cereals are grasses cultivated for the edible components of their grain. 

Cereal may also refer to:

Breakfast cereal
an adjective referring to the goddess Ceres
cereals and pseudocereals collectively
Caryopsis
Food grain
Cereal (magazine), a UK travel and style magazine
Cereal, Alberta, Canada
"Cereal," an episode from the 20th season of Arthur

See also
Cereals Event which takes place in the UK
Cerean (disambiguation)
Ceres (dwarf planet)
Serial (disambiguation)